The 2000 European Nations Cup was the first European Nations Cup, an international rugby union competition for second-tier nations. It replaced the FIRA Tournament following the emergence of professionalism in rugby union and Italy being granted a place in the Six Nations.

The first season had six teams (five from Europe and one from Africa). The teams played each other once, playing roughly to the same weekends as the Six Nations. Romania won the first title, with a single loss to Morocco in the opening game. Georgia improved their performance in the context of European rugby, finishing in second place, while Morocco finished in third place, ahead of Spain and Portugal. Netherlands finished last.

Table

Matches

Week 1

Week 2

Week 3

Week 4

Week 5

See also
 European Nations Cup Second Division 2000
 European Nations Cup Third Division 2000
 European Nations Cup Fourth Division 2000
 FIRA – Association of European Rugby
 Six Nations Championship

References

External links
2000 European Nations Cup First Division at ESPN

1999–2000
1999–2000 in European rugby union
1999–2000 in Spanish rugby union
2000 in Moroccan sport
2000 in Georgian sport
2000 in Dutch sport
1999–2000 in Romanian rugby union
2000 in Portuguese sport